Relizane is a province (wilaya) of Algeria. Relizane is the capital. Other localities include Bendaoud, Bouzegza, Hamri, Kalaa, Mazouna and Zemmoura. The Wilaya of Relizane massacres of 4 January 1998 happened in Relizane.

History
The province was created from Mostaganem Province in 1984.

Administrative divisions
The province is divided into 13 districts (daïras), which are further divided into 38 communes or municipalities.

Districts (daïras)

 Ain Tarik
 Ammi Moussa
 Djidiouia
 El H'Madna
 El Matmar
 Mazouna
 Mendes
 Oued Rhiou
 Ramka
 Relizane
 Sidi M'Hamed Ben Ali
 Yellel
 Zemmoura

Communes

 Aïn Rahma
 Ain Tarik
 Ammi Moussa
 Belassel Bouzegza
 Bendaoud
 Beni Dergoun
 Beni Zentis
 Dar Ben Abdellah
 Djidioua
 El Guettar
 El H'Madna
 El Hamri
 El Hassi
 El Matmar
 El Ouldja
 Had Echkalla
 Kalaa
 Lahlef
 Mazouna
 Mediouna
 Mendes
 Merdja Sidi Abed
 Ouarizane
 Oued Essalem
 Oued Rhiou
 Ouled Aiche
 Ouled El Djemaa
 Ouled Sidi Mihoub
 Ramka
 Relizane
 Sidi Khettab
 Sidi Lazreg
 Sidi M'Hamed Ben Ali
 Sidi M'Hamed Benaouda
 Sidi Saada
 Souk El Had
 Yellel
 Zemmoura

References

 
Provinces of Algeria
States and territories established in 1984